Duméril's worm lizard (Leposternon octostegum) is a worm lizard species in the family Amphisbaenidae. It is endemic to Brazil. The crested caracara is the only predator witnessed consuming this lizard, although it is likely a prey item for other predators. The species is considered endangered in Brazil due to its narrow geographic range.

References

Leposternon
Reptiles of Brazil
Endemic fauna of Brazil
Legless lizards
Reptiles described in 1851
Taxa named by André Marie Constant Duméril